Stuart James Pearson (born 21 June 1949) is an English former professional footballer who played as a forward. He appeared in three FA Cup finals, two for Manchester United and one with West Ham United.

Club career

Hull City
Pearson started his career with hometown club Hull City, whom he joined as an amateur while doing an apprenticeship as a telephone engineer. He scored 44 league goals for the Tigers after becoming a first team regular when record scorer Chris Chilton left in 1971. 

An assistant manager to Terry Neill at the time was Tommy Docherty, who subsequently became manager of Manchester United and signed Pearson in May 1974 for £200,000, with reserve player Peter Fletcher moving to Hull as part of the deal.

Manchester United
Pearson was bought by Manchester United after they were relegated to the Second Division and was instrumental in getting the club promoted back to the First Division the next season by scoring 17 goals. Every time he scored a goal he would celebrate with a raised right fist. He was in the team that lost 1–0 to Southampton in the 1976 FA Cup Final. The next year Pearson helped Manchester United win the 1977 FA Cup Final against Liverpool, scoring the first of Manchester United's goals in their 2–1 win. He was sidelined for nearly all of the 1978–79 season due to a knee injury but made a full recovery before leaving Manchester United for West Ham United in August 1979.

West Ham United
He helped the Hammers win the 1980 FA Cup Final, with his cross-shot setting up Trevor Brooking for the only goal in a 1–0 win over Arsenal. During interviews after the game, Barry Davies described him as "a big occasion player" and suggested that but for his injuries he would have been England's finest striker.

Pearson retired from league football in 1982 due to a knee injury, but continued to play at a lower level, in South Africa and the NASL.

International career
Pearson won 15 caps for England between 1976 and 1978, scoring five goals.

Coaching career
After retiring as a player, Pearson moved into coaching, serving as coach of Stockport County in 1985–86 and manager of Northwich Victoria during the first half of 1986–87. He became assistant manager/coach at West Bromwich Albion in 1988 and acted as caretaker manager for six games in 1991 following Brian Talbot's departure. Pearson left Albion in 1992 and was assistant manager at Bradford City from 1992 to 1994. He has also been a pundit for MUTV. He moved to Spain in the mid-2000s.

Career statistics

Honours
Manchester United
Football League Second Division: 1974–75
FA Cup: 1976–77
FA Charity Shield: 1977

West Ham United
FA Cup: 1979–80

References

External links

Profile at StretfordEnd.co.uk

Living people
1949 births
People from Cottingham, East Riding of Yorkshire
Footballers from the East Riding of Yorkshire
English footballers
England international footballers
England under-23 international footballers
Hull City A.F.C. players
Manchester United F.C. players
Northwich Victoria F.C. managers
Northwich Victoria F.C. players
West Ham United F.C. players
West Bromwich Albion F.C. managers
English Football League players
Bradford City A.F.C. non-playing staff
Stockport County F.C. non-playing staff
West Bromwich Albion F.C. non-playing staff
Association football forwards
English football managers
FA Cup Final players